Obiora Chinedu Okafor is a Canadian lawyer, currently the York Research Chair at Osgoode Hall Law School, York University, and the Gani Fawehinmi Distinguished Chair of Human Rights Law at Nigerian Institute of Advanced Legal Studies.
He is also the United Nations Independent Expert on Human Rights and International Solidarity since 2017, a position he will hold for five years.

References

Academic staff of York University
Canadian lawyers
Year of birth missing (living people)
Living people